The AF-S DX Nikkor 18-140mm f/3.5-5.6G ED VR is a superzoom lens manufactured by Nikon, introduced in August 2013 for use on Nikon DX format digital SLR cameras.

The lens includes vibration reduction to counter camera shake. It uses an extra-low dispersion glass element to minimize chromatic aberration. Internal focusing and silent wave motor are focus characteristics. Two switches are provided on the lens. One of them can be used to switch vibration reduction on/off and the other is used to switch between auto-focus and manual focus. Like all lenses in the DX format, the 18-140mm casts a smaller image circle than lenses for full-frame 35mm cameras and is therefore only compatible with cameras having APS-C-sized sensors (or vignetting will result).

References

See also
List of Nikon compatible lenses with integrated autofocus-motor
Nikon F-mount

Camera lenses introduced in 2013
Nikon F-mount lenses